The BH Telecom Indoors was a professional tennis tournament played on indoor hard courts. It was currently part of the ATP Challenger Tour. It was held annually in Sarajevo, Bosnia and Herzegovina each March since 2003.

Andreas Beck was the singles title holder with 2 wins, so as were Jaroslav Levinský and Jonathan Marray independently in doubles.

Past finals

Singles

Doubles

External links
 Official website

 
ATP Challenger Tour
Hard court tennis tournaments
Tennis tournaments in Bosnia and Herzegovina
Spring (season) events in Bosnia and Herzegovina